Li County or Lixian (Qiang: pauɕuq) is a county in Ngawa Tibetan and Qiang Autonomous Prefecture, Sichuan, China. China National Highway G317 and the Zagunao River run through the whole territory.

On May 12, 2008, the area was affected by the 2008 Sichuan earthquake.

Geography
Li County is located from  (30.911944°, 102.546111°) to  (31.203333°, 103.508333°).

Climate

Administrative divisions 

Demographics
As of 2018, Li County had a registered population of 43,375. 11,706 of the county's population, or 27%, is urbanized.

Ethnic groups

Transport 
China National Highway 317

Notes

External links
 (in Chinese) New County Government Website
  Old County Government Website - 
 Li County (bashu.net) - 

County-level divisions of Sichuan
Ngawa Tibetan and Qiang Autonomous Prefecture